Epacroplon is a genus of beetles in the family Cerambycidae, containing the following species:

 Epacroplon armatipes (Martins, 1962)
 Epacroplon cruciatum (Aurivillius, 1899)

References

Ibidionini